Soundtrack To The Personal Revolution is the debut full-length album for the band Burnt by the Sun, released on Relapse Records.

Track listing
All Songs Written By Burnt by the Sun.
 "Dracula with Glasses" – 1:46
 "Soundtrack to the Worst Movie Ever" – 2:32
 "Dow Jones and the Temple of Doom" – 2:48
 "Boston Tea Bag Party" – 2:40
 "Shooter McGavin" – 2:48
 "Mortimer" – 2:45
 "Don Knotts" – 3:22
 "Famke" – 2:59
 "Human Steamroller" – 3:17 	
 "Rebecca" – 4:14

Personnel
Mike Olender- Vocals
John Adubato - Guitar
Chris Rascio - Guitar
Ted Patterson - Bass
Dave Witte - Drums

Production
Produced By Matt Bayles & Burnt By The Sun
Engineered By Matt Bayles
Mastered By Alan Douches

References

Burnt by the Sun (band) albums
2002 albums
Albums produced by Matt Bayles
Relapse Records albums